Randy Duck (born November 2, 1975) is a former American professional basketball player. He played college basketball for California Golden Bears

References

External links
Ex-Cal player Randy Duck at home when teaching hoops
Randy Duck College Stats

1975 births
Living people
American expatriate basketball people in North Macedonia
Guards (basketball)
California Golden Bears men's basketball players
American men's basketball players
San Diego Stingrays players